Willemien Jonetta "Wiljon" Vaandrager (born 27 August 1957 in Brummen, Gelderland) is a former international rower from the Netherlands, who won the bronze medal in the Women's Eights at the 1984 Summer Olympics in Los Angeles, California, alongside Marieke van Drogenbroek, Lynda Cornet, Greet Hellemans, Nicolette Hellemans, Harriet van Ettekoven, Catharina Neelissen, Anne Quist, and Martha Laurijsen.

References
 Dutch Olympic Committee
 Database Olympics profile

1957 births
Living people
People from Brummen
Dutch female rowers
Olympic rowers of the Netherlands
Rowers at the 1984 Summer Olympics
Olympic bronze medalists for the Netherlands
Olympic medalists in rowing

Medalists at the 1984 Summer Olympics
20th-century Dutch women
21st-century Dutch women
Sportspeople from Gelderland